Eugène Marie Henri Fouques Duparc (21 January 1848 – 12 February 1933) was a French composer of the late Romantic period.

Biography 
Son of Charles Fouques-Duparc and Amélie de Guaita. Henri Fouques-Duparc was born in Paris. He studied piano with César Franck at the Jesuit College in the Vaugirard district and became one of his first composition pupils. 
Following military service in the Franco-Prussian War, he married Ellen MacSwiney, from Scotland, on 9 November 1871. In the same year, he joined Saint-Saëns and Romain Bussine to found the Société Nationale de Musique.

Duparc is best known for his 17 mélodies ("art songs"), with texts by poets such as Baudelaire, Gautier, Leconte de Lisle and Goethe.

A mental illness, diagnosed at the time as "neurasthenia", caused him abruptly to cease composing at age 37, in 1885. He devoted himself to his family and his other passions, drawing and painting. But increasing vision loss after the turn of the century eventually led to total blindness. He destroyed most of his music, leaving fewer than 40 works to posterity. In a poignant letter about the destruction of his incomplete opera, dated 19 January 1922, to the composer Jean Cras, his close friend, Duparc wrote:

He spent most of the rest of his life in La Tour-de-Peilz, near Vevey, Switzerland, and died in Mont-de-Marsan, in southwestern France, at age 85.

Duparc is buried at Père Lachaise Cemetery in Paris. A square in the 17th arrondissement of Paris, near the rue de Levis, is named in his honor.

Works

Bibliography

Writings by Henri Duparc (in French) 
 César Franck pendant le Siège de Paris, in « Revue musicale », Paris, December 1922. 
 Souvenirs de la Société Nationale, in « Revue de la Société internationale de Musique », Paris, December 1912.

Letters (in French) 
 Lettre à Chausson, in « Revue musicale », December 1925.
 Duparc Henri : Une Amitié mystique, d'après ses lettres à Francis Jammes. (Preface and comments by G. Ferchault). Mercure de France, Paris, 1944. 
 Gérard, Y. (Ed.). Lettres de Henri Duparc à Ernest Chausson, in « Revue de Musicologie » (N° 38) 1956, p. 125. 
 Sérieyx, M.-L. (Ed.). Vincent d’Indy, Henri Duparc, Albert Roussel : lettres à Auguste Sérieyx. Lausanne, 1961.

Monographs on Duparc (in French) 
 Northcote, S. The Songs of Henri Duparc. London: D. Dobson, 1949. 124 pp. 
 Von der Elst, N. Henri Duparc : l’homme et son oeuvre. (Thesis). Paris: Université de Paris, 1972, & Utrecht, 1972. 
 Fabre, M. L'image de Henri Duparc dans sa correspondence avec Jean Cras. 1973.

Other articles and writings about Duparc (in French) 
 Fellot, H. Lieder français : Henri Duparc, in  « Revue Musicale de Lyon ». Lyon, 30 March 1904. 
 Chantavoine, J. Henri Duparc, in « La Revue Hebdomadaire », Paris, 5 May 1906. 
 Aubry, G.-J. Henri Duparc, in « La vie musicale de Lausanne », Lausanne, 1 February 1908. 
 Jammes, Francis. L'Amour, les Muses et la Chasse, in « Mercure de France », Paris, 1922, p. 172 et al. 
 Fauré, Gabriel. Opinions musicales.  Paris: Rieder, 1930. 
 Imbert, M. Henri Duparc, in « La Petite Maîtrise », Schola Cantorum de París, March 1933. 
 Ansermet, Ernest. Un émouvant témoignage sur la destinée d'Henri Duparc, in « Revue Musicale », Paris, April 1933. 
 Bréville, P. Henri Fouques Duparc 1848-1933, in « La Musique Française », Paris, May 1933. 
 Merle, F. Psychologie et Pathologie d'un artiste: Henri Duparc. Bordeaux: Imprimerie de l'Université (Bordeaux), 1933. 
 Oulmont, C. Henri Duparc, ou de L'Invitation au Voyage à la Vie éternelle. Paris: Desclée de Brouwer & Cie, 1935. 
 Oulmont, C. Un Duparc inconnu, in « Revue musicale », Paris, July–August 1935. 
 Stricker, R. Henri Duparc et ses mélodies. (Thesis). Paris: Conservatoire national de musique, 1961. 
 Rigault, J.-L. Les mélodies de Duparc, Autour de la mélodie française. Rouen, 1987, p. 71-86. 
 Stricker, R. Les mélodies de Duparc. Arles, 1996.

External links

  
 

1848 births
1933 deaths
19th-century classical composers
19th-century French composers
19th-century French male musicians
20th-century classical composers
20th-century French composers
20th-century French male musicians
Burials at Père Lachaise Cemetery
French male classical composers
French Romantic composers
Pupils of César Franck